Stanislav Otáhal (30 December 1913 – 31 May 2004) was a Czech middle-distance runner. He competed in the men's 800 metres at the 1936 Summer Olympics.

References

1913 births
2004 deaths
Athletes (track and field) at the 1936 Summer Olympics
Czech male middle-distance runners
Olympic athletes of Czechoslovakia
Place of birth missing